Merryton railway station is a railway station in Larkhall, Scotland. The station is managed by ScotRail and lies on the Argyle Line.

The station was officially opened on 9 December 2005, as part of the Larkhall branch re-opened at the same time.

The station is located on the CR Mid Lanark Lines just south of the site of the previous Merryton Junction where the Caledonian Railway Coalburn Branch diverged from the CR Mid Lanark Lines.

Facilities
The station has a car park but is not permanently staffed.

Services
From the opening of the Larkhall Branch in December 2005, a service has operated on Monday to Saturdays to  via  northbound and to  southbound every 30 minutes.

In December 2007 an hourly service (in each direction) commenced on Sundays. This runs to Larkhall and to  via .

References

Sources
 
 RAILSCOT on Coalburn Branch
  RAILSCOT on Merryton Junction
 New Link for Larkhall opens - BBC News Scotland website

Railway stations in South Lanarkshire
Railway stations opened by Network Rail
Railway stations in Great Britain opened in 2005
SPT railway stations
Railway stations served by ScotRail
Larkhall